Michal Lahav (born 3 October 1999) is an Israeli chess player who holds the FIDE title of Woman International Master (WIM, 2019). She was an Israeli Women's Chess Championship winner in 2016.

Biography
In 2016, Lahav won Israeli Women's Chess Championship. In 2016, she ranked 3rd in World Youth Chess Championship in girl's U18 age group.

She played for Israel in the Women's Chess Olympiads:
 In 2016, at reserve board in the 42nd Chess Olympiad (women) in Baku (+2, =2, -0),
 In 2018, at reserve board in the 43rd Chess Olympiad (women) in Batumi (+1, =2, -2).

Lahav played for Israel in the European Women's Team Chess Championships:
 In 2017, at reserve board in the 21st European Team Chess Championship (women) in Crete (+0, =3, -1),
 In 2019, at fourth board in the 22nd European Team Chess Championship (women) in Batumi (+3, =3, -2).
In 2019, she won 2nd- 4th place in the Israeli Open Championships along with Gad Rechlis and Victor Mikhalevski with 7/9 points.

In 2019, she received the FIDE Woman International Master (WIM) title.

References

External links

1999 births
Living people
Israeli female chess players
Chess Woman International Masters
Chess Olympiad competitors